Namhangdaegyo (남항대교) is a girder bridge in Busan. It spans Yeongdo-gu and Seo-gu and is 1.8 km long in total with four lanes of traffic (two in each direction).

History

 broke ground on 1995
 1998 stopped construction because of financial troubles
 July 9, 2008 opened to the public

Effects
The bridge was constructed as part of the Southern Busan Thoroughfare (부산남부순환로) initiative. It has significantly reduced time between Yeongdo Island and
western Busan. Initially, a trip from Seo-gu to Yeongdo-gu (or vice versa) was 7 km long and would take 30 minutes. Now, it is only 2 km long and takes 3 minutes.

See also
 Gwangandaegyo -another bridge part of the Southern Busan Thoroughfare

External links
 Busan Infrastracture Corporation(부산시설공단) 

Buildings and structures in Busan